Agriphila deliella is a species of moth of the family Crambidae. It is found in most of Europe and North Africa and from Anatolia to Afghanistan.

The wingspan is 16–20 mm. There is one generation per year with adults on wing from August to September.

The larvae feed on various Poaceae species, including Corynephorus canescens, Carex arenaria and Molinia caerulea.

Subspecies
Agriphila deliella deliella (Europe, Asia Minor, Transcaucasus, North Africa, Algeria, Afghanistan)
Agriphila deliella hispanodeliella Bleszynski, 1959 (Spain)
Agriphila deliella asiatica Caradja, 1910 (Iran)

References

External links 
 Microlepidoptera.nl
 Lepidoptera of Belgium

Crambini
Moths of Europe
Moths of Africa
Moths of Asia
Moths described in 1813